Claude Antoine Dacosta (1931 – 1 May 2007) was a Congolese politician who served as the Prime Minister of the Republic of the Congo from December 6, 1992, until June 23, 1993.

References

1931 births
2007 deaths
Prime Ministers of the Republic of the Congo